Beau Brummell: This Charming Man is a 2006 BBC Television drama based on the biography of Beau Brummell by Ian Kelly. The title references a 1983 song by The Smiths.

Production
The film was commissioned by BBC Four for broadcast as part of its 2006 The Century That Made Us season.

Reception
Nancy Banks-Smith writing in The Guardian said the film was exquisite to see and very easy to enjoy, stating that, it was one of those plays where the director of photography and the costume and set designers, who normally bring up the rear, led the whole parade. She also compliments Hugh Bonneville for his, frighteningly feasible Prince Regent. She concludes that, the Georgians had a natural beauty in their lives which makes ours seem ugly.
     
Jodie Pfarr writing in The Sydney Morning Herald describes the film as, an engaging costume drama romp, which provides, a fascinating account of the relationship between Brummell and the prince. He calls the show, Queer Eye for the Straight Guy 18th-century style, and concludes that, the moral of the story is all can be fine and dandy until you tell someone they're fat.

Synopsis
Brummell shares an intimate moment with Prince George while advising him on his wedding outfit (which is incorrectly shown in the film as a ceremonial dress) and, invites him to dinner along with his friends. He is appointed as royal sartorial advisor by the newly dandified Prince and all debts of his are dropped as word of his new position is spread. He and the Prince become close friends drinking and gambling in the clubs of London straining his finances and relations with others.

Brummell's relationship with the Prince is strained as his fame begins to spread. He becomes enamoured with the dangerous Lord Byron against the warnings of the Prince further straining their relationship. He ignores a summons from the Prince to enjoy the favours of Miss Julia along with Byron. His manservant Robinson is forced to intervene when the Prince and Byron go head-to-head.

Brummell's loss of royal favour leaves him outcast and indebted as the bailiffs begin to turn violent. He takes out a large loan with some close associates and even steals from Robinson but quickly gambles it all away. A disgraced and equally destitute Byron returns to London but the two fall out. Unable to pay back the loan he is expelled from his club, abandoned by Robinson, and forced to flee to France.

Cast
 James Purefoy as Beau Brummell
 Hugh Bonneville as Prince Regent
 Phil Davis as Robinson
 Elliot Levey as Tailor
 John Telfer as Fop
 Tim Hudson as Fop
 Zoe Telford as Julia
 Justin Salinger as Richard Meyler
 Nicholas Rowe as Lord Charles Manners
 Ian Kelly as Lord Robert Manners
 Jonathan Aris as Marquis of Worcester
 Daniel Fine as Cloth Merchant
 Nick Richards as Snuff Merchant
 Anthony Calf as Duke of York
 Matthew Rhys as Lord Byron
 Rebecca Johnson as Duchess of York
 Max Gell as Palace Footman
 Howard Coggins as Edward

Sources
The film is based on the 2005 biography Beau Brummell: The Ultimate Dandy by Ian Kelly who also appeared in the film.

Selected editions

References

External links
 
 

2006 British television series debuts
2006 British television series endings
Period television series
BBC television dramas
Television series set in the 1810s
Television films based on books
Cultural depictions of George IV
Cultural depictions of Lord Byron
Cultural depictions of Beau Brummell
Films directed by Philippa Lowthorpe